Gian Marco Javier Zignago Alcóver (born 17 August 1970) is a Peruvian musician and actor. He has won the Latin Grammy Award for the Best Singer-Songwriter Album three times. First in 2005 for his album Resucitar, in 2011 for his album Días Nuevos, and in 2012 for his album 20 Años. Gian Marco was named UNICEF Goodwill Ambassador in Peru.

His mother is the Peruvian actress and singer María Regina Alcóver Ureta, and his father was the late Peruvian composer and singer Javier Óscar Florencio Zignago Viñas, known in the musical world as Joe Danova.

Biography

Childhood beginnings
Gian Marco was born in Lima, Peru on 17 August 1970. His mother is actress and singer María Regina Alcóver Ureta, while his father is composer and singer Javier Óscar Florencio Zignago Viñas, also known as Joe Danova. As the son of artists, Gian Marco was introduced to music at very early age. The art surrounded him during his childhood. Gian Marco grew up listening to the songs of his father, and watching his mother perform in theater.

As a child he traveled with his parents and learned to love the life style of an artist. At age 12, Gian Marco sang for the first time on television in the Argentine TV show Domingos Gigantes (Giant Sundays), broadcast by Channel 9 in Buenos Aires under the direction of Orlando Marconi. A year later, Gian Marco sang in Caracas on the TV show La Revista de los Sábados (The Saturday Magazine) impressing viewers that enjoyed a thirteen-year-old child singing a popular song titled "Eva Maria". At the age of six he recorded a 45 rpm together with his father entitled "Navidad Es" ("Christmas Is").

Gian Marco attended elementary school, middle school, and high school at the Colegio Santa Margarita located in Monterrico, a middle-class neighborhood in the district of Santiago de Surco, in Lima. He played the guitar and sang in all school activities. In 1981, at age 11, Gian Marco recorded a song for the musical Papito Piernas Largas (Daddy Long Legs). His mother also participated in the play. During his youth, Gian Marco participated in a series of artistic events, singing and acting, developing his talents and preparing for what would become a successful career.

After finishing school, at the age of 18, Gian Marco traveled to Santiago de Chile to pursue a graphic design career. Although things were going well for him in the graphic design field, Gian Marco continued to feel the pull of a music career. To prove himself as an artist, he began playing in the most popular venues in Santiago and Viña del Mar where he began to make a name for himself.

First album
A year and a half later he returned to Lima and one of his songs classified for the Peruvian version of the Festival OTI 1989 and his first contract with a record label which proyected him to Chile and Bolivia as well as doing theater and alternating in the telenovela "Velo negro, velo blanco with Braulio Castillo Jr. and Guatavo Rojo. He managed to capture the attention of the press, being the most publicized artist at the event. It was there that Discos Independientes proposed recording his first album. At the beginning of 1990 his first production hit the national record market with the title Gian Marco: Historias that achieved hits as "Domitila" and "Mírame" ("Look at me"), under the musical direction of Pepe Ortega.

In 1992 he recorded his second album, production with the title Personal, produced in Santiago, Chile by Pepe Ortega. From this recording the songs "Te Extrañaré" ("I Will Miss You") and "Dame un Beso" ("Give Me a Kiss") made the charts that year. In September 1993 he won first place in the national version of the Festival OTI, and gained the right to represent Perú in the "XXII edition of the International Festival OTI" with his song "Volvamos a Empezar" ("Let's Start Over"). The International Festival took place in Valencia, Spain.

Television and national recognition
In the mid to late 1990s he came back with other successful productions. He began to dedicate himself to composing songs, and he was called to conduct one of the most popular game shows, Campaneando, with Bruno Pinasco. Conducting this program was crucial in gaining the recognition of the wider Peruvian public. His television appearance combined with a prolific period of musical activity. He composed and recorded the albums Entre la arena y la luna, (Between the Sand and the Moon) (1994), Señora, Cuénteme (Lady, Tell Me) (1994), and Al Quinto Día (On the Fifth Day) (1997). His fourth album, Señora, Cuénteme, is a tribute to canción criolla in which he affirms with his music the appreciation that he has for the feeling of native peoples like those in Perú.

International success
Inspired by his own dreams and a blind faith in his talent, Gian Marco decided to travel to the United States, convinced that he needed to introduce his artistic talent to the international market. He got the attention of Emilio Estefan who hired him as a composer and performer. He worked with Estefan on a couple tracks for Mandy Moore's self-titled album. This did not stop him from working on his own material, and he published A Tiempo (On Time) (2002) under the label Crescent Moon/Sony; this album was heard on the most significant radio stations in the world, and sold more than 50,000 copies in Spain. The album earned him with three Latin Grammy nominations and confirmed him as the most significant Peruvian sing-songwriter of recent times.

In that same year, Gian Marco recorded the theme song for the Americas Cup (Soccer) that would be played in Perú in 2004. The song entitled "Más allá de los sueños" ("Beyond Dreams"), became a resounding success. In 2003, he received the "Artista Revelación Latino" (Emmerging Latin Artist) prize in the Musical Arts Awards of the Sociedad General de Autores y Editores de España (SGAE) (Spanish General Society of Authors and Editors).

Later came the album Resucitar (Resurrection) (2004), a much more organic album that, as he says "doesn't sing as much about lost love as the previous one, it's a more positive album". This disc had unbelievable success, which brought him a Latin Grammy in 2005. Several singles were released from this album: "Resucitar" ("Resurrection"), "Sin querer" ("By Accident"), "Gota de lluvia" ("A Drop of Rain"), "Después de mi" ("After Me"), "Lejos de ti", ("Far from You"), and "Soy" ("I Am").

15 years of career
On 2005 Gian Marco held a show at the Estadio Monumental de Perú to celebrate his career of 15 years, and had more than 40,000 spectators. Several guests including Regina Alcover (his mother), Mauricio y Palo de Agua, Pelo Madueño and Antonio Cartagena, among others, clothed in this emotional Gianmarco concert. The concert ended with a rendition of "Hoy" ("Today"), which ended with a mix of "huaynos". Grandes Éxitos (Greatest Hits), was released in 2006, by Phantom Records only in Peruvian territory. This album focuses at Gian Marco's fifth album Al Quinto Día (The Fifth Day), and also highlight the best songs of his other works. Also that year, he recorded the song for the animated film Dragones: Destino de fuego (Dragons: Destiny of Fire), where is the performer of the soundtrack, also titled "Destino de fuego".

On 17 November 2006, Gian Marco releases 8, which includes ten unreleased tracks and features the first single in Peruvian territory, a song titled "No Te Avisa" ("It Doesn't Warn You"), for the rest of the world, the first single was "¿Qué Pasa?" ("What's Up?"), a song in which Gian Marco foray into the rap and gives its followers a somewhat different sound than they normally are used to hear. The album 20 Years, was made to celebrate 20 years of artistic life. There are 20 songs, 18 of which are re-recorded, and two unreleased songs "Invisible" and "In another Life". The song "Invisible" was composed by Gian Marco and Amaury Gutierrez. In 2012 he was awarded in Mexico a Quadruple Platinum Certification by his label for selling over 400,000 copies of his albums in Latin America since the beginning of his career as an independent artist in 2006. Later that year he won his third Latin Grammy.

Artistry
The singer has been making public the Latin American market as a composer, and also has written songs for Marc Anthony ("Este Loco Que Te Mira", "Hasta Que Vuelvas Conmigo", "Caminaré"), Pandora ("Mientras Tanto"), Jon Secada ("Amanecer", "Si No Fuera Por Ti"), Jaci Velasquez ("Bendito Amor"), Obie Bermúdez ("Me Cansé de Ti", "El Recuerdo"), Emmanuel ("En Otra Vida"), Alejandro Fernández ("Canta Corazón", "Tengo Ganas", "Dame Un Minuto", "No Se Me Hace Fácil"), and Gloria Estefan ("Hoy", "Tu Fotografía", "Mientras Tanto"), Luis Enrique ("Parte de este Juego"), among others. Gian Marco has been important brand image as Pepsi, Inca Kola, currently one of the leading companies in mobile telephony in Peru Claro. He is recognized as one of the best songwriters in Peruvian history as well as one of the artists that puts Peruvian music on the international map by several media including Billboard Magazine.

Awards and nominations

Discography

Historias (1990)

 Canción De Amor
 Domitila
 Te Extrañaré
 Ojalá No Sea Tarde
 Dame Un Beso
 Mírame
 Dos Historias
 Avísame
 Somos Dos
 ¿Cuántas Horas Más?
 Dejame Soñar Contigo
 Libres
 Corazón Solitario
 Shubi Duwa
 No Hieras Mi Corazón

Personal (1992)

 Dame Un Beso
 Te Extrañaré
 Libres
 Shubi Duwa
 ¿Cuántas Horas Más?
 Negrita
 No Hieras Mi Corazón
 Canción de Amor
 Dos Historias
 Te Estoy Buscando
 Somos Dos

Entre la Arena y la Luna (1994)

 No Puedo Amarte
 Gorrión
 Quédate
 ¿Dónde Estarás?
 Parte de Este Juego
 Cuando Quiero Amarte
 Corazón de Cartón
 Tómate el Tiempo Que Quieras
 Ya Tienes Dueño

Amor Y Descontrol: 31 Exitos (1995)

Señora, Cuénteme (1996)

 La Flor de la Canela
 Caricia
 Camarón (El Gallo de Oro)
 Extravío
 Jamás Impedirás
 Jarana
 Gracia
 Señora, Cuénteme
 Secreto
 Cuando Llora Mi Guitarra
 El Plebeyo
 Ojos Azules (feat. Mercedes Sosa)
 Viva el Perú y Sereno
 Corazón
 Shadia

Al Quinto Día (1997)

 Si Estuvieras Aquí
 Verano o Primavera en Abril
 Mírame
 Sé Que Piensas en Mi
 Muero Por Ti
 Fragilidad
 Corazón en la Ciudad
 Déjame Amarte
 Funky Aha

A Tiempo (2002)

A Tiempo (Edicion Colombia) (2002)

 Se Me Olvidó
 Al Otro Lado de la Luna
 Su Encanto en Mi
 Te Mentiría
 Por Ti
 Lamento
 Simplemente Espiritual
 No Logro Entender
 Retrato
 Mujer
 Ave María
 Volveré
 Sentirme Vivo
 Se Me Olvidó (Versión Salsa)
 Se Me Olvidó (Versión Dance)

Resucitar (2004)

 Gota de Lluvia
 Después de Mi
 Resucitar
 Sortearme en Tu Suerte
 Sin Querer
 Flor de Arena
 Si Me Vuelvo a Enamorar
 Lejos de Ti
 En Cada Recuerdo
 Soy
 Ayer
 Tú y Yo

Grandes Éxitos (2006)

 Sé Que Piensas en Mi
 Fragilidad
 Mírame
 Sin Querer
 Se Me Olvidó
 Resucitar
 Lamento
 Lejos de Ti
 Si Estuvieras Aquí
 Gota de Lluvia
 Al Otro Lado de la luna
 Corazón en la Ciudad
 Después de Mi
 Te Mentiría

8 (2006)

 El Amor Es Un Juego
 Dibújame el Camino
 Cuando Tú No Estás
 Quiero Saber
 Sin Permiso
 ¿Qué Pasa?
 No Te Avisa
 Loco
 Nunca Más Te Ví
 Vientos del Sur

Desde Adentro (2008)

 Canta Corazón
 Hasta Que Vuelvas Conmigo
 Hasta Que la Vida Pase
 Tu Fotografía
 Mientras Tanto
 Tengo Ganas
 Me Cansé de Ti
 Parte de Este Juego
 Sentirme Vivo
 Todavía
 Hoy
 Lamento

En Vivo Desde El Lunario (2009)

 Vientos del Sur
 Hoy
 Canta Corazón
 Hasta Que la Vida Pase
 Mientras Tanto
 Me Cansé de Ti
 Lamento
 Se Me Olvidó
 Gota de Lluvia
 Tu Fotografía
 Todavía
 Hasta Que Vuelvas Conmigo
 Quiero Saber
 Lejos de Ti
 Retrato
 Sin Querer
 Sentirme Vivo

En Tiempo Real DVD (2010) 
 
 Dime donde
 Ando por la visavida
 Amores imperfectos
 De paseo
 Desde hace un mes
 En venta
 Expreso 2222
 Ojos azule/Adiós pueblo de Ayacucho/Valicha
 Roxanne
 Imagina
 Sentirme vivo

Gianmarco De Siempre (2011)

Días Nuevos (2011)

 Cuéntame
 Más Allá
 Respirar (ft. Alejandro Sanz)
 Desde Hace Un Mes
 De Paseo
 Dime Dónde (ft. Juan Luis Guerra)
 Amores Imperfectos
 Sabes Que Cuentas Conmigo (ft. Diego Torres)
 En Venta
 Si Me Tenías
 Días Nuevos

20 Años(2012) 

 Canción de Amor
 No Puedo Amarte
 Parte de Este Juego
 Invisible
 Sé Que Piensas en Mí
 Fragilidad
 Sentirme Vivo
 Se Me Olvidó
 Te Mentiría
 Retrato
 Lamento
 Resucitar
 Lejos de Ti
 Al Otro Lado de la Luna
 Hoy
 En Otra Vida
 Hasta Que Vuelvas Conmigo
 Canta Corazón
 Dime Donde
 Días Nuevos

Versiones (2013)

 Cartas Amarillas
 Almohada
 Capullito de Aleli
 Amor de mis Amores
 Come Fly With Me
 Perfidia
 La Flor de la Canela
 Domitila
 Ella
 Corcovado
 Tal Para Cual
 La Vida Nos Espera
 Si No Fuera Por Ti
 Rabo de Nube

#Libre(2015)

 Aunque ya no vuelva a verte
 Mis Cicatrices
 Vida de mi Vida
 La Vida Entera
 Tengo el Alma Perdida
 Tan Fuerte
 Siempre Tú
 El Amor Que Te Tuve
 Quiéreme
 Tu Mejor Amigo

Siete Semillas (Cd Single) (2016)

Por Ti Peru Hoy (Ep) (2017)

Besame (Cd Single) (2018)

Intuición (2018) 
 
 Más de lo que yo te Quiero
 Tú No Te Imaginas
 Me Gusta mi Soledad
 Bésame
 Lo Que Nunca Fui con Nadie
 Nadie Más que Tú
 Sácala a Bailar
 Empecemos a Vivir
 Nada Cambia
 Cómo Decirte Que No
 Tú No Te Imaginas – Bachata Version

Mandarina (2021) 
 "No Va A Ser Fácil"
 "Mandarina"
 "Pasa"
 "Empezar De Nuevo"
 "Prefiero Vivir Sin Ti"
 "Asi Soy Yo" 
 "Espejismo"	
 "Quédate Hasta Que Amanezca" 
 "En Tu Maleta"
 "Calma En Mi"
 "Empezar De Nuevo (Remix)"

Charts

Weekly charts

References

1970 births
Living people
Latin music songwriters
Latin Grammy Award winners
People from Lima
Peruvian male composers
Peruvian people of Italian descent
Peruvian singer-songwriters
Recipients of the Order of the Sun of Peru
UNICEF Goodwill Ambassadors
20th-century Peruvian male actors
20th-century Peruvian male singers
20th-century Peruvian singers
21st-century Peruvian male singers
21st-century Peruvian singers